Campville is a community in eastern Alachua County, Florida, north of Hawthorne. The community grew up along the route of the Florida Transit and Peninsular Railroad, with a sawmill, a store, a church, a school and a score of homes in the area when a post office was established in 1881. It was named for three brothers by the name of Camp who ran a large sawmill in the area. The population was about 300 in 1928, when a brick factory, several tree nurseries, and four stores were located in the community. The brick factory was also founded by the Camp brothers and bricks produced there can be seen in Gainesville's old downtown buildings. The bricks are a tan buff color. The post office was closed in 1966.

References

Unincorporated communities in Alachua County, Florida
Gainesville metropolitan area, Florida
Unincorporated communities in Florida